The 8 Metre was a sailing event on the Sailing at the 1908 Summer Olympics program in Ryde.  Three races were scheduled. Each nation could enter up to 2 boats. 26 sailors, on 5 boats, from 3 nation competed.

Race schedule

Course area  
The following course was used during the 1908 Olympic 6-Metre regattas in all three races:
 Start at Ryde Pier
 №3. Fairway Buoy
 West Measured Mile Buoy
 Boyne Buoy off Portsmouth Spit
 Finish at Ryde Pier

Weather conditions

Final results 
The 1908 Olympic scoring system was used. All competitors were male.

Daily standings

Other information

Extra awards 
 Gilt commemorative medal:
 Blair Cochrane owner of Cobweb
 Silver commemorative medal:
 Royal Gothenborg Yacht Club  owner of Vinga
 The Duchess of Westminster owner of Sorais
 C. Wisbeck owner of Fram

Further reading

References 

8 Metre
8 Metre (keelboat)